Darrell Peter Panizza (born 11 March 1959 in Bunbury, Western Australia) is a former Australian rules footballer who represented  in the West Australian Football League (WAFL) and the now-defunct Woodville Football Club in the South Australian National Football League (SANFL) during the 1980s and 1990s. He also represented and coached Western Australia in interstate football.

Playing career

Claremont
Panizza joined Claremont in 1979 from the Albany Royals and played in WAFL premiership teams in 1981, 1991 and 1993. He retired having played 274 matches in two stints, the first between 1979 and 1986; and the second between 1990 and 1995. He holds the record for the most games played at Claremont.

Woodville
In 1987 he moved to South Australian National Football League (SANFL) club Woodville where he played 74 matches in three seasons.

Western Australia
Panizza played six games for Western Australia including the 1983 side that won the Australian Championships.

Coaching career

Claremont
In 1996, after retiring as a player he coached Claremont to a WAFL premiership.

Royals
Rejoining his boyhood club, Panizza took the Royals to unprecedented success, winning six Great Southern Football League premierships between 1999 and 2004.

Hall of Fame
Panizza was inducted into the WA Football Hall of Fame in March 2009.

References

1959 births
Living people
Claremont Football Club players
Claremont Football Club coaches
Woodville Football Club players
Australian rules footballers from Western Australia
West Australian Football Hall of Fame inductees
People from Albany, Western Australia